John Ross Bowie (born May 30, 1971) is an American actor and comedian best known for playing Barry Kripke on The Big Bang Theory and Jimmy DiMeo on Speechless, in addition to over 100 film and TV credits. 

He appeared in What the Bleep Do We Know!? opposite Marlee Matlin and made guest appearances on shows such as Reno 911!, Curb Your Enthusiasm, Glee,  and Good Luck Charlie. In March 2011 he began a run in a series of commercials for the Ford Motor Company.

Bowie is a regular sketch comedy performer at the Upright Citizens Brigade Theater (UCBT) in New York and Los Angeles. At UCBT he was a member of the sketch troupe "The Naked Babies" with comedians Rob Corddry, Seth Morris, and Brian Huskey. He had a recurring role in Corddry's Adult Swim series Childrens Hospital. A former member of New York pop punk band, Egghead, he worked with Big Bang Theory co-star Kevin Sussman to create two television comedies, The Ever After Part and The Second Coming of Rob.

Bowie has written for Go Metric and The New York Press, and has authored a book on the cult movie Heathers.

His memoir, No Job For A Man, was published in November 2022 by Pegasus Books, a division of Simon & Schuster. Publishers Weekly called the book a "smart, pithy memoir with an earnest emotional arc."

Personal life
His parents, both deceased, were Bruce and Eileen Bryan Bowie (1942–2018). He is married to comedian Jamie Denbo. They have a daughter and a son.

He graduated from the Bayard Rustin High School for the Humanities in 1989, and holds a Bachelor of Arts in English from Ithaca College.

Filmography

Film

Television

Podcast

References

External links

1971 births
Living people
Male actors from New York City
American male comedians
American male film actors
American male television actors
People from Manhattan
21st-century American male actors
American people of Scottish descent
Comedians from New York City
Upright Citizens Brigade Theater performers
21st-century American comedians